Tropical Storm Chantal was a short-lived tropical storm that affected Bermuda in its formative stages and caused flooding and gusty winds in Newfoundland while extratropical. The storm accelerated northeastward over an area of progressively colder water temperatures, and after a decrease in convection the National Hurricane Center ceased issuing advisories as Chantal began undergoing extratropical transition early on August 1. Shortly thereafter, the extratropical remnant crossed over southeastern Newfoundland before tracking into the open waters of the north Atlantic Ocean. Prior to forming, the storm dropped moderate rainfall on Bermuda. Subsequent to becoming extratropical, the remnants of Chantal produced gusty winds and heavy precipitation across the Avalon Peninsula of Newfoundland, causing flooding and wind damage; insured damage totaled $25 million (2007 CAD, $24.3 million 2007 USD).

Meteorological history 

A frontal system moved off the Carolinas on July 21, and as it drifted southeastward it degenerated into a trough of low pressure; by July 26, it was nearly stationary to the east of the Bahamas. Deep convection initially failed to persist, though on July 28 meteorologists began tracking it with the Dvorak technique. The system tracked northeastward, and initially unfavorable environmental conditions left the system disorganized. However, conditions were forecast to become more conducive for development, and by July 29 the National Hurricane Center remarked it had "potential for tropical or subtropical development." On July 30, the low passed to the west of Bermuda as it continued northeastward, under the influence of a large mid-latitude trough. The system contained an exposed low-level circulation, which intermittently passed beneath a persistent area of convection to its northeast.

Upon receiving its classification, the depression consisted of a partially exposed low-level center with deep convection occupying the northeastern semicircle. Located over sea surface temperatures of about 80 °F (27 °C), one forecaster noted the depression had "a small window of opportunity... for it to reach tropical storm strength before transitioning to an extratropical cyclone." The storm tracked through an area of progressively cold waters and cooler air, resulting in the weakening of its convection. The circulation became embedded within the approaching frontal zone, and by 0600 UTC on August 1 Chantal transitioned into an extratropical cyclone.

After becoming an extratropical cyclone, Chantal maintained scattered convection near its center, though its main area of convection and clouds extended to its north. Midday on August 1, the cyclone struck Newfoundland along the Avalon Peninsula, hitting the Placentia Area with full force. It subsequently intensified to attain winds of near hurricane-force. On August 3 the cyclone underwent a final weakening trend in the far northern Atlantic Ocean, and on August 5 the extratropical remnants of Chantal merged with another extratropical cyclone to the east of Iceland.

Impact 
The precursor disturbance to Chantal began affecting Bermuda on July 30, producing scattered storms and increased cloud cover. Thunderstorms were reported on the island, and maximum reported winds on the island reached . At around 2300 UTC on July 31, a buoy to the southeast of Nova Scotia reported a pressure of 995 mbar as Chantal passed nearby.

Shortly after it first became a tropical storm, the Atlantic Storm Prediction Center of Canada issued gale warnings for the coastal waters off Newfoundland. Later, the Newfoundland Labrador Weather Office issued heavy rainfall warnings for southeastern Newfoundland. In offshore waters, wave heights reached . Onshore, the storm produced moderately strong winds, with an unofficial peak gust of  reported near where the storm moved ashore. The extratropical remnants of Chantal dropped heavy rainfall in a short duration across Newfoundland;  fell in 1 hour at St. John's West, the highest hourly rainfall total. The rainfall caused flooding and street washouts in several towns along the Avalon Peninsula, such as Ship Harbour, Fox Harbour, and Dunville. Several communities in the region declared states of emergencies.

In Ship Harbour citizens were isolated for 5 days until a temporary road was made. Insured damage across the area totaled $25 million (2007 CAD, $24.3 million 2007 USD).

See also 

List of Bermuda hurricanes
 List of Canada hurricanes
 Other storms of the same name

References

External links 

 

2007 Atlantic hurricane season
Atlantic tropical storms
Hurricanes in Bermuda
Hurricanes in Canada
Chantal

de:Atlantische Hurrikansaison 2007#Tropischer Sturm Chantal
nl:Atlantisch orkaanseizoen 2007#Tropische storm Chantal